Jabalah may refer to:

Jabalah IV ibn al-Harith (died 528), king of the Ghassanids
Al-Harith ibn Jabalah (died c. 569), king of the Ghassanids
Jabalah ibn al-Aiham (died c. 645), king of the Ghassanids
Jabalah, Syrian city Jableh